This is a list of all current broadcasters of content related to the Tennessee Titans, a National Football League franchise based in Nashville, Tennessee, United States.

Radio
 
The Titans' flagship radio station is Nashville-based, but Gallatin-licensed Fox Sports Radio affiliate WGFX. Mike Keith is the team's play-by-play announcer, having taken over those duties starting with the team's inaugural season as the Tennessee Titans in 1999. He served as the color commentator in 1998, the team's final year as the Tennessee Oilers. Former Titans linerback coach and Cardinals head coach Dave McGinnis is the current color commentator. He replaced former Titans tight end Frank Wycheck in 2017. Wycheck had replaced Pat Ryan starting with the 2005 NFL season. Larry Stone is the Titans Radio gameday host. The Titans Radio Network is broadcast on some 70 other stations. 

Until 2011, the team long resisted placing any of its game broadcasts on Sirius XM Radio, the only team to do so.  However, Titans broadcasts are also available on the Internet-based FieldPass.

Television

Locally produced news-magazine programs
Titans All Access is the 30-minute program devoted to the Titans providing behind-the-scenes footage of the games, and a preview of their next matchup. It initially airs on weekends during football season on Fox affiliate WZTV, with replays airing on   affiliate CW affiliate WZTV-DT2 and MyNetworkTV affiliate WUXP. The program is also broadcast on the internet via the team's YouTube channel. 

In addition, WKRN, Nashville’s ABC affiliate, airs another locally-produced sports show, Titans on 2, which is a weekly show that provides the coach an opportunity to talk about the team's latest match-up and looks forward to the upcoming match-up. The show also features a different Titans player every week.

Past television game coverage
From 1990 until 1994, and again in 1997, Raycom Sports had broadcast rights to preseason games. WKRN, along with WMC-TV/Memphis, and WVLT-TV/Knoxville, were the three stations that ran those broadcasts in the 1997 preseason.

Current game coverage on television

All preseason games are broadcast over the Titans Preseason Network, which is a seasonal network with Nashville ABC affiliate WKRN-TV serving as the flagship. WKRN also has local over-the-air broadcast rights to any of the Titans’ appearances on ESPN’s Monday Night Football. 

Since the start of the 1998 NFL Season, the CBS Television Network is in charge of the AFC road games and most all-AFC games on Sunday afternoons. Anytime the Titans play host to an NFC team at Nissan Stadium, the team’s home venue, the game(s) are aired on Fox.

In the event of a Sunday night game assigned to the Titans regular season schedule, NBC provides nationwide coverage for the NBC Sunday Night Football games, including WSMV, which also has over-the-air simulcasting duties for any Titans game broadcast exclusively on NFL Network, including that network’s Saturday game specials in the latter few weeks of the season.

Starting in 2014, CBS began simulcasting the NFL Network’s Thursday Night Football games for weeks 2-9 of the regular season. Therefore, if the Titans appear in any Thursday Night Football games within those eight weeks of the season, the game will not only be on the NFL Network, but it’ll also be seen nationally on CBS, regardless of market area. Until 2014, any of the team’s appearances on TNF not simulcast on CBS are locally simulcast on Fox affiliate WZTV. In 2016, the TNF simulcast deal has extended to include NBC for weeks 11-16, with CBS remaining to simulcast TNF for weeks 2-6. From the 2018 to 2021 NFL seasons, TNF simulcasts are broadcast on Fox for weeks 2-14. 

Additionally, in Canada, all of the Titans appearances on Monday Night Football are simulcast nationwide on ESPN’s Canadian sister cable channel, TSN and its French language counterpart, RDS, Réseau des sports. Sometimes, when the Titans are to appear in a late Sunday afternoon game against any NFL team based along the Canadian border (i.e. Seattle Seahawks, Detroit Lions, Buffalo Bills), the CTV Television Network may pick up Canadian broadcast rights to those games on a regional basis. All Canadian NFL broadcasts on CTV and TSN are subject to Simultaneous substitution. In some instances, anytime a Sunday regional coverage game involving the Titans on CBS or Fox that are broadcast on any local affiliates in Seattle, Buffalo, or Detroit, can be viewed anywhere in Canada via cable or Satellite television, as most of Canada’s cable and satellite television providers carry American television signals from those markets.

Television affiliates

Notes

See also
History of the Tennessee Titans 
Tennessee Titans 
Titans Preseason Football
Titans Radio Network 
National Football League on television

References

External links 
Titans Radio
Titans All Access 
Tennessee Titans official website 

 

broadcasters
Tennessee Titans announcers 
American Football League announcers 
Houston Oilers announcers